Borki  (German Borrek) is a village in the administrative district of Gmina Dobrzeń Wielki, within Opole County, Opole Voivodeship, in south-western Poland.

References

Borki